{{DISPLAYTITLE:C22H24FN3O2}}
The molecular formula C22H24FN3O2 (molar mass: 381.45 g/mol, exact mass: 381.1853 u) may refer to:

 ADB-FUBICA
 Benperidol

Molecular formulas